Prison of Desire is the debut album by Dutch symphonic metal band After Forever. It was released on 21 April 2000 by Transmission Records. The album contains the first four installments (three parts and a prologue) of The Embrace That Smothers, a collection of songs by Mark Jansen which deals with the influence and distortion of religion in human society. This theme was carried over to the Epica albums The Phantom Agony and The Divine Conspiracy.

The final track, "Beyond Me", features a guest appearance of Sharon den Adel, lead singer in Within Temptation.

The album was reissued in June 2008 by the re-financed Transmission Records, as a two-disc set containing previously unreleased studio sessions, instrumental/a cappella tracks, and a handful of demo recordings. Guitarist Sander Gommans has urged fans not to buy this re-release through the band's official forum.

In 2021, it was elected by Metal Hammer as the 6th best symphonic metal album of all time.

Track listing

Personnel
After Forever
 Floor Jansen – vocals
 Mark Jansen – guitar, grunts
 Sander Gommans – guitar, grunts
 Jack Driessen – keyboards
 Luuk van Gerven – bass guitar
 Joep Beckers – drums

Additional musician
 Sharon den Adel – vocals on "Beyond Me"

Choir
 Hans Cassa, Caspar de Jonge, Yvonne Rooda and Melissa 't Hart

Production
 Hans Pieters – engineering
 Dennis Leidelmeijer – engineering
 Oscar Holleman – choir producer, engineering, mixing
 Hans van Vuuren – executive producer, coordination and research
 Peter van 't Riet – mastering

References

2000 debut albums
After Forever albums
Transmission (record label) albums